Doctor Mora  is a Mexican city (and municipality) located in Northeast region of the state of Guanajuato. The municipality has an area of 233.91 square kilometres (0.77% of the surface of the state) and is bordered to the north by Victoria, to the east by Tierra Blanca, to the south by San José Iturbide, and to the west by San Luis de la Paz. The municipality has a population of 24,976 according to the 2015 census.

Doctor Mora is named after José María Luis Mora.

The municipal president of Doctor Mora and its many smaller outlying communities is Mario Arvizu.

References

Municipalities of Guanajuato
Populated places in Guanajuato